Sergio Salas (born March 21, 1981 in Cochabamba) is a Bolivian former footballer who last played for West Texas United Sockers in the USL Second Division.

Career

Youth
Salas moved from his native Bolivia to the United States as a child, settling with his family in McLean, Virginia. He attended Mclean High School, but chose to not to play college soccer, instead turning professional straight out high school when he signed a Project-40 contract with Major League Soccer.

Professional
Salas was drafted in the third round (27th overall) of the 2000 MLS SuperDraft by D.C. United.   He spent most of the season on loan to MLS Pro 40, but played one game, 18 minutes in total for D.C. before being released at the end of the season.  Following his release from DC, Salas bounced around the American lower-leagues, playing for Northern Virginia Royals in the USL Second Division, and the amateur Indios USA in the National Premier Soccer League, before signing on with Bolivian pro team Club Aurora in 2005. In 2006 Salas joined Municipal Real Mamore on a one-year loan. That year the Team won the Bolivian 2nd division tournament Simon Bolivar and won promotion to 1st division.

Salas returned to the United States in 2009 to play for the West Texas United Sockers in the USL Premier Development League, before moving to the Real Maryland Monarchs in the USL Second Division.

References

External links
 Real Maryland Monarchs bio
 
 BDFA profile 

1981 births
Living people
Sportspeople from Cochabamba
Bolivian footballers
Club Aurora players
D.C. United players
Northern Virginia Royals players
Midland-Odessa Sockers FC players
Real Maryland F.C. players
Major League Soccer players
USL Second Division players
USL League Two players
Expatriate soccer players in the United States
Bolivian expatriate footballers
Bolivian expatriate sportspeople in the United States
A-League (1995–2004) players
MLS Pro-40 players
D.C. United draft picks
Association football midfielders